Beersheba metropolitan area  is a metropolitan area in Israel that encompasses the Beersheba and Southern Districts of Israel. It is located in the Negev desert and constitutes the fourth largest metropolitan area in the country, with an estimated population of over 377,100.

Metropolitan rings
Israel Central Bureau of Statistics divides the Beersheba metropolitan area into two areas:

Notes
1 The population of "Jews and others" incl. Jews, non-Arab Christians and those not classified by religion.
2 Includes the city of Beersheba.
3 Includes the cities Rahat, the local councils Lehavim, Omer and Tel Sheva, as well as many smaller towns (local councils).

Transportation

Transit
Rail service connects the Beersheba metropolitan area with Ashkelon, Tel Aviv and Haifa. Bus service connects to Eilat, Ashkelon, Tel Aviv, Haifa, and Jerusalem.

Major highways

Highway 40
Highway 25
Highway 31
Highway 60
Highway 80

See also
List of cities in Israel

References

Regions of Israel
Beersheba
Metropolitan areas of Israel
Geography of Southern District (Israel)